Erich Wasicky (born May 27, 1911 in Vienna – died May 28, 1947 at Landsberg Prison, Landsberg am Lech, Allied-occupied Germany) was a pharmacist at the Mauthausen concentration camp in charge of gassing victims.

Wasicky was a physician. He joined the NSDAP and was a member of the SS. Between 1941 and 1944, he worked as a pharmacist at Mauthausen concentration camp. It was his duty to select victims to die in the gas chamber. The exact number of his victims is not known, but more than 3,100 died in neighboring Hartheim concentration camp, which fell under Wasicky's jurisdiction. After the Nazis started using the poison Zyklon B, Wasicky was put in charge of establishing this process in both Mauthausen and Hartheim.

According to witnesses, Wasicky worked closely with SS pharmacist Aribert Heim. The two performed gruesome experiments together, such as injecting various solutions into the hearts of Jewish prisoners to see which killed them the fastest.

After the end of World War II, Wasicky was tried for war crimes by a U.S. military tribunal. On May 13, 1946, he was found guilty and sentenced to death. On May 28, 1947, he was hanged in Landsberg Prison.

References

External links
 Erich Wasicky
 
 

1911 births
1947 deaths
Mauthausen concentration camp personnel
Mauthausen Trial executions
SS-Sturmbannführer
Aktion T4 personnel
Physicians from Vienna
Executed Austrian Nazis
Waffen-SS personnel
Physicians in the Nazi Party
Austrian people of Slavic descent
Holocaust perpetrators in Austria
Executed mass murderers